A Stitch in Time is a 1976 children's novel by Penelope Lively.  It was the winner of the 1976 Whitbread Award for children's book. 40 years later, it was re-published by Collins under the modern classics range.

The book follows Maria Foster during a summer holiday in Lyme Regis. She begins to hear sounds that no one else can and connects with a Victorian girl called Harriet, but as she becomes more immersed in Harriet's World she wonders if something tragic took place.

References

External links

 Library holdings of A Stitch in Time

1976 British novels
British children's novels
Novels by Penelope Lively
Heinemann (publisher) books
1976 children's books
Novels set in Dorset
Lyme Regis